Kenneth Ray Whitesell (born July 19, 1961) is a vice admiral in the United States Navy, and the current Commander, Naval Air Forces.

Education
Whitesell grew up in Stuarts Draft, Virginia. He graduated from Old Dominion University in 1983 with a Bachelor of Science in Mechanical Engineering. He is also a graduate of the Joint Forces Staff College and the Naval War College, where he earned a Master of Arts in National Security and Strategic Studies.

Naval career
Whitesell became a Naval Aviator in the United States Navy, being commissioned at the Aviation Officer Candidate School in February 1985 and earning his wings of gold in October 1986. He graduated from the Navy Fighter Weapons School (TOPGUN) and flew the F-14 Tomcat and, later, the F/A-18 Super Hornet. He has over 4,000 flight hours. 

His operational assignments have been:
 Fighter Squadron VF-142, 
 Top Gun training officer and assistant operations officer with VF-74, 
 VF-32, 
 Strike Fighter Squadron VFA-41, 

Whitesell has participated in Operations Desert Shield, Southern Watch, Deliberate Guard/Allied Force, Iraqi Freedom and Inherent Resolve.

Overseas assignments ashore:
 Combined Air and Space Operations Center battle director, Al Udeid Air Base, Qatar
 Chief of staff and director, Maritime Operations Center, Commander, United States Navy Central Command/Commander, United States Fifth Fleet

Commands

Whitesell has served as commander of:
 Strike Fighter Squadron VFA-41, USS Nimitz
 Carrier Air Wing One aboard ,
 Carrier Strike Group 2 aboard ,
 Naval Air Forces (COMNAVAIRFOR) and Naval Air Force, Pacific Fleet (COMNAVAIRPAC).

Awards and decorations

References

External links
 COMNAVAIRFOR website

1961 births
United States Navy personnel of the Gulf War
United States Navy personnel of the Iraq War
Living people
Naval War College alumni
Old Dominion University alumni
Recipients of the Legion of Merit
Recipients of the Navy Distinguished Service Medal
United States Naval Flight Officers
United States Navy vice admirals